Clare Cunningham (née Bishop on born 15 June 1977) is a retired Paralympic swimmer and triathlete who represented Great Britain. She was born without her left forearm.

Cunningham first swam in international competition at the age of 13, at the 1990 World Championships and Games for the Disabled in Assen, The Netherlands. At the 1992 Summer Paralympics, Cunningham won the Women's S9 50m freestyle event in what was then World Record time. She won silver medals in 100m freestyle, 100m backstroke, 4 × 100 m freestyle relay and 4 × 100 m medley relay events. She competed at the 1996 Summer Paralympics but did not win a medal. She retired from swimming after the Atlanta Paralympic games.

In 2006, Cunningham turned to triathlon. Initially competing in age-group races against non-disabled triathletes, she discovered paratriathlon in 2009. Classified as a TRI-4 (arm-impaired) paratriathlete, she became the 2009 ITU European Paratriathlon Champion and 2009 World Paratriathlon Champion in her class. She placed second at the ITU World Paratriathlon Championships in 2010, 2011, and 2012, and third in 2013 and 2014.

In late 2012, Cunningham was elected to the International Triathlon Union Athletes Committee. She and South African Oswald Kydd, elected on the same day, are the first-ever paratriathlete representatives on the ITU Athletes Committee.

Cunningham competed in paratriathlon at the 2016 Summer Paralympics in the PT4 category and finished seventh.

To prepare for Rio 2016, Cunningham took a sabbatical from her career as a Chartered Accountant at Deloitte. She has a 2:1 MA Honours in English Language and Literature from the University of St Andrews, Scotland.

Since retiring, Cunningham has gained an MSc in Sport and Exercise Psychology with distinction from Loughborough University.  Cunningham is now using her wide range of experience of Paralympic sport in her role as Head of Athlete Services at the British Paralympic Association.  The Beijing 2022 Winter Paralympic Games were her second games as a member of ParalympicsGB where, as Deputy Chef de Mission, she was responsible for all areas of team education, safeguarding, welfare and anti-doping. 

Cunningham, alongside Sir Matthew Pinset, was recruited to the SportAid Board of Trustees at the start of 2023. She was appointed as a director for a three-year term.

References

External links 

 Clare Cunningham's website

Paratriathletes of Great Britain
British female triathletes
Paralympic swimmers of Great Britain
Swimmers at the 1992 Summer Paralympics
Swimmers at the 1996 Summer Paralympics
Paratriathletes at the 2016 Summer Paralympics
Paralympic gold medalists for Great Britain
Paralympic silver medalists for Great Britain
1977 births
Alumni of the University of St Andrews
Living people
People from Hillingdon
Medalists at the 1992 Summer Paralympics
British female freestyle swimmers
Paralympic medalists in swimming
British female butterfly swimmers
British female backstroke swimmers
S9-classified Paralympic swimmers
Medalists at the World Para Swimming Championships